Ashley Black's FasciaBlaster is a self-treatment tool that says it helps loosen the fascia — the connective tissue around muscles and organs — to ease stiffness and help reduce cellulite. A study was published in 2019 about the effects of fascia manipulation using the FasciaBlaster tools. Study conclusions included the safety and efficacy of FasciaBlaster devices. The conclusions also showed improved remodeling of collagen, a decrease in fat (adipose tissue) at the blasted site, and a reduction in the appearance of cellulite.

Overview 
FasciaBlaster was first created to help the inventor, Ashley Black, deal with her own pain.

The device has been featured in health, fitness, and well-being media spaces and has been used by celebrities such as Kourtney Kardashian, Derek Jeter, Leonardo Decaprio, Brett Favre and Travis Hafner.

The FasciaBlaster was launched to a wider consumer market after early users reported that the tool helped to take away their cellulite.

By May 2022, FasciaBlaster had expanded into the South American, European, East Asian, and Australian markets.

Clinical review
A clinical evaluation of the tool was conducted by the Applied Science and Performance Institute (ASPI) of Tampa, Florida, which the website claims support assertions made for the tool.

A number of participants in the ASPI trial published complaints about severe side effects arising from the use of the tool on Facebook and were sued by Ashley Black for defamation and breach of nondisparagement clauses in their contract of engagement in the study. Black dropped the suits after losing a similar disparagement case in Texas.

After peer review and analysis of the study’s findings, Cogent Medicine Volume 6, 2019, published and validated the conclusions.  It was analyzed that after consistent 90-day use of the FasciaBlaster tool, every participant of the study saw that "fascia manipulation techniques, through use of the FasciaBlaster devices, can decrease subcutaneous adipose tissue (SAT), and the appearance of cellulite in adult women over 12 weeks. Evidence also showed improved collagen remodeling."

Criticism 
According to an article published in BuzzFeed in 2017, some users have claimed they have hurt themselves and produced long-lasting bruising using the self-massage tool. They submitted complaints to the FDA

In 2017, two proposed class action lawsuits were mounted against Ashley Black for fraud and other torts. However, all lawsuits and claims have been dropped by the court

Damages and costs amounting to over $250,000 were awarded against Ashley Black after an anti-SLAPP repudiation of her claims of defamation against a FasciaBlaster user who complained about injury arising from the use of the tool. 

By May 2020, all of the lawsuits against Ashley Black And The FasciaBlaster were voluntarily dismissed.

Ashley Black has further asserted that cyberbullies have used Facebook to harass her and her business, including customers and family, Black claims some have made false claims of injuries to her products and posted on review sites, and even harassed news outlets to pay attention to their claims.

References 

Medical devices